Warbirds is an extended play by American hardcore punk band This Is Hell. The album was released on August 18, 2009 through Think Fast! Records. Similar to This Is Hell's 2007 extended play, Cripplers, this release features unreleased new material in addition to cover songs. The album is available in 7" vinyl and digital download formats, and will not be available on CD after Think Fast's decision in January 2009 to only release music in digital and vinyl formats. Warbirds was This Is Hell's first release since their departure with Trustkill Records, as announced in April 2009. The first pressing was limited to 1,300 physical copies (300 in clear/blue vinyl, 700 in black vinyl and 300 in white/pink vinyl as a Hot Topic exclusive color).

The songs on the album feature more of a crossover thrash sound than the band's previous hardcore punk style. Guitarist Rick Jimenez stated in a press release that the songs were influenced by Metallica, Anthrax, Cro-Mags and Leeway.

Track listing
 "The Search" – 2:28
 "Warbirds" – 1:09
 "Worship Syndrome" – 2:40
 "Crazy But Not Insane" (Warzone cover) – 2:11
 "Never Tear Us Apart" (INXS cover) – 2:56

Personnel
This Is Hell
 Travis Reilly – vocals
 Andrew Jones – bass
 Rick Jimenez – guitar, vocals
 Ben Mead – drums

Production
 Produced by Jim Siegel at The Outpost
 Mastered by Jason Livermore at The Blasting Room

Art
 Artwork and layout by Josh Shearon
 Logo by Glenn Catteeuw

References

External links
Think Fast! Records

2009 EPs
This Is Hell (band) albums
Think Fast! Records albums